Kop or KOP may refer to:

Places
 King of Prussia, Pennsylvania, a suburban town located twenty miles west of Philadelphia, Pennsylvania, US
 Nakhon Phanom Airport (IATA code), Thailand

Organisations
 Border Protection Corps, a Polish military unit
 Kansallis-Osake-Pankki, a former Finnish bank
 Knights of Pythias, a fraternal organization and secret society in Washington, D.C., US
 Ecological and Environmental Movement, a minor political party in Cyprus

Arts and entertainment
 KOP (album), an album by Turkish pop singer Mustafa Sandal
 The Knights of Prosperity, a TV series and the fictional title group of protagonists

Other uses
 Chhatrapati Shahu Maharaj Terminus, Kolhapur, India (station code: KOP)
 Koppie, an isolated rock hill, knob, ridge, or small mountain that rises abruptly from a gently sloping or virtually level surrounding plain
 Spion Kop (stadiums), a colloquial name or term for a number of terraces and stands at sports stadiums, particularly in the UK
 Kappa-opioid receptor

See also
 Spion Kop (disambiguation)
 Cop (disambiguation)
 Cyprus Football Association (Greek: Κυπριακή Ομοσπονδία Ποδοσφαίρου, ΚΟΠ)